Sofía Gómez Uribe (born 15 April 1992) is a Colombian freediver and civil engineer. She holds six national records in three different freediving disciplines ("depth apneas"), a Bolivarian Games record set at the 2013 Games in Trujillo, Peru, that won her a gold medal in the Women's individual dynamic apnea free-diving event, and a Pan-American record in dynamic apnea with equipment.

Personal life
Gómez was born in Pereira, Risaralda, Colombia. Her parents Francisco and Mónica are from Santa Marta. Gómez attended the Immaculate Heart of Mary School. In 2001, she took up synchronised swimming and in 2002, she took up finswimming. After finishing high school, Gómez moved to Bogotá for a year and now lives in Medellín. In 2016, she graduated from the National University of Colombia at Medellín, and she now works as a civil engineer. In 2017, Gómez set up a fundraising campaign to help people in Dominica affected by Hurricane Maria. In 2020, Gómez apologised for racist and classist comments made on Twitter between 2010 and 2011.

Goméz is in a relationship with chef Juan Diego Vanegas. The couple announced their engagement in June 2021, and married in March 2022.

Career
In 2013, a friend encouraged Gómez to take up freediving, a sport that involves underwater diving without breathing apparatus. After some training, she managed to dive , and decided to take up the sport professionally.

In 2016, she broke the Pan-American records for the constant weight with fins and free immersion events at the Vertical Blue competition.

In 2017, she broke the CMAS Constant Weight Bi-Fins freediving world record after descending  in a time of 2 minutes and 43 seconds, beating Alenka Artnik's previous record of  set the previous year in Kaş, Turkey. Two days later, she broke her own world record by diving . At the 2017 CMAS World Championship, Artnik and Ukrainian Nataliia Zharkova both dived .

In 2018, Gómez participated in a scientific study to measure her body's functions in extreme conditions. The record was set under World Underwater Federation (CMAS) rules at the Kas Baska freediving competition in advance of the CMAS World Championships.

In 2021, Gómez returned to freediving, having taking a break due to a medical issue and the COVID-19 pandemic. She was sponsored by Grupo Argos. She came third at the 2022 Vertical Blue event.

References

Colombian freedivers
Colombian civil engineers
People from Pereira, Colombia
1992 births
Living people
National University of Colombia alumni
Universidad de Medellín alumni